Straid (from the ) is a small village in County Antrim, Northern Ireland, about three miles east of Ballyclare, and about six miles inland from Carrickfergus. It lies at the centre of the townland of Straidlands, in the Civil Parish of Ballynure within the Antrim and Newtownabbey Borough Council area, and in the former barony of Belfast Lower. The village has a congregational church, an Orange hall, and a primary school.

History
The village is of pre-Norman antiquity. Human habitation goes back in the area many thousands of years, and of great local excitement were the discovery of Bronze Age cist graves nearby. For an exhibition at the Ulster Hall in 1870, the Rev. James Bain of Straid Congregational Church contributed arrow-heads, spear-heads, flint and bronze tools, and ancient coins which had been found in the Straid area. There are other pre-historic earthworks threatened by the expansion of the village.

The name of the village is an Anglicisation of the Irish Gaelic word Sraid, meaning "street", as it was originally just a street. The village has historically developed along Main Street, which contains many original buildings. In recent years, development has been concentrated between Main Street and Irish Hill Road. Straid Primary School and Straid Congregational Church are in the village, the inscription on the church reads "Ebenezer, erected 1816, rebuilt and enlarged 1837" There is also a freemason’s hall.

The local river is called the Bryantang, meaning "the fairy-fort of the tongue."  This may refer to a fort, which was located close to Straid Dam (Straid Fisheries) in the middle of Bryantang townland.  The existence of the rath (one of many in the area) was noted in the 1839 Ordnance Survey Memoirs on the land of James Boyd, but by 1875 it was said to have been destroyed.

Note: The 'Bronze Age Cysts' discovery of 1990 was in Straid, Londonderry and not as suggested here, from the village of Straid, Ballyclare.

19th century
Straid was influenced by the 1859 Christian revival under the then-pastor James Bain. Tom Shaw writes: "The cockfighting pit, which had been a place for vice of the worst kind, became a preaching point where many were won to Christ. Public bars began to close, and profanity and drunkenness, which characterized many lives, were set aside as the Spirit of God moved through the community." James Bain describes a typical revival Sabbath: "Our Sabbath services are continuous, from nine in the morning until ten at night. We are engaged from nine to twelve in prayer meetings for the young, from twelve to two in public service, from two to four in prayer meetings, from five to eight in the evening service, and finally in our evening prayer meeting. The evening services at the church became so well attended that the only suitable place to assemble was outdoors. At one of these evening gatherings, some of the new converts gave testimony, and Bain preached two sermons. The whole audience was gripped with a sense of intense spiritual anxiety. Numbers cried for mercy, and not a single soul departed from that scene until morning." In June 1859, 3000 people gathered for an open-air service in a field adjoining the village.

Contemporary description
STRAID is a village less than 2 miles east of Ballyclare, in the barony of Lower Belfast. It had a population of 111 in 1881. Bauxite mines are worked in the immediate vicinity. From Straid Hill, there is a fine view of the surrounding country. The land is good for dairying. Crops: potatoes, oats, and some flax. Straid is in the postal district of Ballyclare. Letters should be addressed, Straid, Ballyclare

Although a small village, it gave the name "Straidlands" to the "townland" of the area. Dominating the village is the "Irish Hill" named after an army camp. A mining village for many years, there is an outcrop of bauxite or Aluminium ore in Irish hill. The woods at the top of the hill have a distinctive gap where a hurricane in the early 1920s blew down part of the forest.

Recent history
In 2003, the village was expanded by 63 houses, creating a new housing estate at "village hill" - Irish Hill Road. For many years, the only two shops in the village were a spirit grocer and Wilson's shop and animal food stuffs. The spirit grocer (a precursor to the modern off licence) was shut when the only alcohol licence for the village was bought by the church to keep Straid "dry" - the nearest pub is slightly over a mile away in the neighboring village of Ballynure. There was culture in the form of Straid Art Gallery, until it shut. Now there is none.

Population

In the 1881 Census, Straid had a population of 111 people. In the 2001 Census, the village  had a population of 312 people. In the 2011 Census, Straid had a population of 384 people owing to the building of a housing development in 2010.

Farming

One of the main crops that made the area rich was flax. Cows are now a common sight in the area, as are sheep. Corn was ground in Straid Corn Mill which was built and operated by the Wilson family. In the 1860s, there was also a kiln and flax mill on the site. To the East of the village towards Carrickfergus, an important part of local heritage was recently destroyed with the demolition of the old flax mill to make way for new housing. This caused some controversy at the time. A famous local group that reflects the agricultural background of the area is "Straid young farmers" club.

Fishing
One of the big attractions to the area is fishing - Straid Fishery is one of the top rainbow trout fisheries in N.Ireland. Based on Straid Dam, which was man-made around 1824 to supply the nearby cottonmill, there are 3 lakes: 20 acre, 2 acre and .5 acre. Fly fishing on the two lake is complemented by a small coarse lake.

See also 
List of villages in Northern Ireland
List of towns in Northern Ireland

References

External links
Straid County Antrim Guide and Directory 1888 

Villages in County Antrim